Gagarinia mniszechii is a species of beetle in the family Cerambycidae. It was described by Chabrillac in 1857. It is known from Brazil.

References

Hemilophini
Beetles described in 1857